The Shanghai–Nanjing intercity railway or Huning intercity railway is a -long high-speed rail line between Shanghai and Nanjing, the capital of Jiangsu province.  and  are shorthand Chinese names for Shanghai and Nanjing, respectively. The Huning intercity high-speed railway largely follows the route of the preexisting Nanjing-Shanghai section of the conventional Beijing–Shanghai railway and the Beijing–Shanghai high-speed railway. Construction of this high-speed railway began in July 2008. The line went into test operations in early April 2010, and opened for full service on July 1, 2010. The journey time between the two cities has been shortened from 120 minutes to 73 minutes on nonstop trains.
According to the arrangements of related departments, 120 pairs of trains are operating on the line, and the time interval between services is 5 minutes at the shortest.

The railway links major cities in the Yangtze River Delta, including Suzhou, Wuxi, Changzhou, and Zhenjiang, effectively making the southern Jiangsu city-belt operate like a single metropolitan region.

The Shanghai–Nanjing intercity high-speed railway is also used by the majority of high-speed trains leaving Shanghai's terminals for Wuhan, Yichang, Chongqing, and Chengdu thus making it de facto a part of the Shanghai–Wuhan–Chengdu high-speed railway.

Route

Stations 
The Shanghai–Nanjing high-speed railway has 21 stations altogether along its route. In both Shanghai and Nanjing, this railway's trains may use either one of two different terminals (Shanghai railway station or Shanghai Hongqiao railway station in Shanghai, and Nanjing railway station or Nanjing South railway station in Nanjing).

Due to the alignment of the rail line, some stations along it are shared with the "conventional" Beijing–Shanghai Railway (Shanghai, Suzhou, Zhejiang, Nanjing), while three others are shared with the new Beijing–Shanghai high-speed railway (Shanghai Hongqiao, Kunshan South, Nanjing South). Due to comparatively frequent spacing of stations on the  Shanghai–Nanjing high-speed railway, quite a few of them are situated at locations not served by either of the two other railways.

Partial station list:

Jiangsu Province

Nanjing City
 Nanjing
 Xianlin

Zhenjiang City
 Baohuashan (closed 10 April 2020)
 Zhenjiang (bus connection available to Yangzhou)
 Dantu
 Danyang

Changzhou City
 Changzhou
 Qishuyan

Wuxi City
 Huishan
 Wuxi
 Wuxi New District

Suzhou City
 Suzhou New District
 Suzhou
 Suzhou Industrial Park
 Yangcheng Lake
 Kunshan South
 Huaqiao

Shanghai Municipality
 Anting North
 Shanghai Hongqiao
 Nanxiang North
 Shanghai West
 Shanghai

At Shanghai Hongqiao, some trains arriving from Nanjing continue to the Shanghai–Hangzhou Passenger Railway, providing a one-seat service along the entire Nanjing–Shanghai–Hangzhou line.

References

External links 

 Route on OpenStreetMap

Rail transport in Shanghai
Rail transport in Jiangsu
High-speed railway lines in China
Railway lines opened in 2010
2010 establishments in China